Micragnostus is a genus of trilobite in the order Agnostida, which existed in what is now north Wales. It was described by Howell in 1935, and the type species is Micragnostus calvus, which was originally described as a species of Agnostus by Lake in 1906.

References

Agnostidae
Trilobites of Europe
Paleozoic life of Alberta
Paleozoic life of Newfoundland and Labrador
Paleozoic life of Yukon